Peter Cummins (born 2 June 1931 in Melbourne) is an Australian retired character actor of stage and screen and chorister who was especially prominent in the 1970s and appeared in some of the most famous Australian films of the period.

He was part of the Carlton group that were influential in Australian theatre of the early 1970s, which also included David Williamson, Max Gillies, Graeme Blundell and Bruce Spence.

Select film credits
Nothing Like Experience (1970)
Country Town (1971)
Bonjour Balwyn (1971)
Stork (1971)
Brumby Innes (1973)
Dalmas (1973)
Alvin Purple (1973)
Between Wars (1974)
The Firm Man (1975)
Sunday Too Far Away (1975)
The Great Macarthy (1975)
The Removalists (1975)
The Dreamers (1976)
God Knows Why, But it Works (1976)
Mad Dog Morgan (1976)
Storm Boy (1976)
 High Rolling (1977)
Blue Fire Lady (1977)
Trial of Ned Kelly (1977)
The Lion's Share (1978)
Double Deal (1983)
Robbery Under Arms (1985)
I Live With Me Dad (1985)
 Twelfth Night (1986)
The Local Rag (1986)
Sky Pirates (1986)
Frog Dreaming (1986)
The Fish Are Safe (1986)
 Kangaroo (1987)
The Umbrella Woman (1987)
Slate, Wyn & Me (1987)
Ground Zero (1987)
The Man from Snowy River II (1988)
Rikky and Pete (1988)
Beyond Innocence (1989)
Turn it up (1991)
The Forest (2003)

References

External links

Male actors from Melbourne
1931 births
Living people